María de las Mercedes Bernardina Bolla Aponte de Murano (20 May 1930 – 26 April 2014), better known as Yiya Murano, and also referred to as The Poisoner of Monserrat was an Argentinian serial killer and swindler. Convicted of three murders, she was imprisoned for 16 years before being sent to an elderly care facility to serve out the remainder of her sentence, due to her advanced age.

Murders 
Nilda Gamba, a neighbor of Murano's died on 10 February 1979. On 19 February, Murano's friend, Leila Chicha Formisano de Ayala, died. Murano owed money to both women, and both bodies showed signs of cyanide poisoning.

On 24 March 1979, Murano's cousin, Carmen Zulema del Giorgio de Venturini, fell and died on the stairs of a building on Hipólito Yrigoyen Street, where she lived.  Zulema's death was initially attributed to cardiac arrest. Zulema's daughter found that a promissory note worth 20 million Argentine peso ley was missing from her mother's belongings. The building's doorman said that Murano arrived for a visit carrying a mysterious package (which was later discovered to contain masas finas), and had casually asked for a copy of the keys to Zulema's apartment keys, saying, "I need her notebook to warn her relatives".  Murano entered her cousin's apartment and left quickly, carrying papers and a jar. She complained loudly: "My God, it's my third friend to die in a short time!" During the autopsy, examiners discovered cyanide in Zulema's body. Investigators discovered the poison in the jar mentioned by the doorman, and in the masas finas.

Arrest 
On 27 April 1979, the police arrested Murano at her home on Mexico Street. In 1980, she was found unconscious in the prison where she was being held; later, they removed one of Murano's lungs.

Murano was convicted in 1985, during the Trial of the Juntas. She insisted upon her innocence, saying: "I never invited anyone to eat."

Murano was released from prison after 16 years. It was learned that she sent the judges who released her a box of chocolates as a token of her appreciation.

Media 
Argentinian writer  included Murano in her book Mujeres Asesinas (Killer Women). In 2006, an episode of the Canal 13 television series of the same name featured a recreation of Murano's crimes. At the end of the episode, the real Yiya Murano appeared and proclaimed her innocence, citing evidence.

The second season of Mujeres Asesinas, the Mexican adaptation of the series, featured an episode based on Murano entitled "Tita Garza, Swindler," starring Patricia Reyes Spindola.

See also 
 List of serial killers by country

References 

1930 births
2014 deaths
Argentine female murderers
Argentine serial killers
Argentine female serial killers
People from Corrientes
Place of death missing
Poisoners